Boris Kosarev (28 July 1951 – 1 March 2021) was a Soviet-Belarusian ice hockey player and coach. He played forward for Traktor Chelyabinsk and HC Dinamo Minsk and subsequently coached the latter from 1982 to 1985. He also coached Yunost Minsk and Khimik-SKA Novopolotsk. He was a Master of Sport of the USSR.

References

1951 births
2021 deaths
Soviet ice hockey players
Belarusian ice hockey players
Soviet ice hockey coaches
Belarusian ice hockey coaches
Traktor Chelyabinsk players
HC Dinamo Minsk players
Sportspeople from Chelyabinsk
Honoured Masters of Sport of the USSR